Saintenoy is a surname. Notable people with the surname include: 

Gustave Saintenoy (1832–1892), Belgian architect
Paul Saintenoy (1862–1952), Belgian architect, son of Gustave